Corpus Domini or Corpus Christi is a Christian feast.

Corpus Domini may also refer to:
Corpus Domini, Bologna
Corpus Domini Monastery (Ferrara), a monastery in Ferrara
Corpus Domini, Turin
Corpus Domini (Venice), a former Dominican convent in Venice